Stomopteryx ochrosema is a moth of the family Gelechiidae. It was described by Edward Meyrick in 1932. It is found in Ethiopia.

References

Endemic fauna of Ethiopia
Moths described in 1932
Stomopteryx